There are currently 438 American colleges and universities classified as Division III for NCAA competition.  Schools from 35 of the 50 states and the District of Columbia are represented.

Conference affiliations listed in this table are primary affiliations as of the current 2022–23 school year. Many schools will house some sports in other conferences if their primary leagues do not sponsor a given sport.

Division III institutions
Reclassifying institutions in yellow.

Notes

Pending
These schools are actively pursuing Division III membership.

Exploratory
These schools are actively exploring Division III membership and were granted the exploratory membership for one year.

See also
List of NCAA Division I institutions
List of NCAA Division II institutions
List of NCAA Division III football programs
List of NCAA Division III ice hockey programs
List of NAIA institutions
List of USCAA institutions
List of NCCAA institutions
List of NJCAA Division I schools
List of NJCAA Division II schools
List of NJCAA Division III schools

Notes

References

NCAA Division III
NCAA
Institutions